Doughton Manor is a country house in Doughton, in the civil parish of Tetbury Upton, in the Cotswold district of Gloucestershire, England. It is recorded in the National Heritage List for England as a designated Grade I listed building. Richard Talboys built the house between 1628 and 1641, and it was restored in 1933. Doughton Manor is adjacent to Highgrove House, the family residence of King Charles III and Queen Camilla.

The house was offered for sale in 2022 at a price of £4 million.

References

External links
Estate agency listing (2023), with photographs and historical notes

Country houses in Gloucestershire
Manor houses in England
Grade I listed houses in Gloucestershire
Cotswold District